Maria Rowena Amelia Villena Guanzon (born August 29, 1957), is a Filipina lawyer, public servant, and politician who notably served as Philippine Commission on Elections commissioner from 2015 to 2022 under President Benigno Aquino III and President Rodrigo Duterte. She had been an audit commissioner before taking office at the Philippine Commission on Elections in February 2015.

Guanzon was mayor of Cadiz in Negros Occidental until 1992, and also served as chief of staff to late Senator Miriam Defensor Santiago, whom she still considers a role model.

Early life and education
Her father is now-retired Regional Trial Court judge Sixto Roxas Guanzon, while her mother, Elvira Causing Villena, is a lawyer and former Cadiz vice-mayor.
"Bing" attended Yuba City High School in California as an exchange student 1974-75.
Guanzon attended  Silliman University High School in Dumaguete. She then took up economics at the University of the Philippines Diliman, and upon graduation proceeded to earn her law degree from the University of the Philippines College of Law, graduating in the top ten of her class and receiving a dean's medal.

Guanzon also holds a master’s degree in public administration from Harvard University's Kennedy School of Government, where she was an  Edward S. Mason fellow and class marshal.

Career

Mayor of Cadiz

Guanzon was appointed mayor of Cadiz, Negros Occidental in 1986 under the 
Provisional Government of the Philippines, which was formed after the 1986 People Power revolution that ousted the Marcos regime and led to the exile of Ferdinand Marcos.

At 28, the appointment made Guanzon the youngest mayor in the Philippines. She was appointed after several other candidates had declined to be mayor of Cadiz, fearing violence from local strongman Armando Gustilo, who had played a key role in the Escalante massacre just a few months earlier, in September 1985. Due to the constant harassment by Gustilo and his supporters, she had to carry firearms for defense, even during social occasions and public events.

The provisional government soon proposed a new constitution, and its ratification in February 1986 meant that appointed local government posts would be replaced by elected officials from the 1988 Philippine elections. Guanzon ran and then won the seat she had been appointed to, as Cadiz mayor.

She served as mayor until the end of her term in 1992.

University of the Philippines College of Law, Diliman

Guanzon taught Election Law and Local Government at the University of the Philippines College of Law in UP Diliman.

Commission on Audit

On March 8, 2013, she was appointed commissioner to the Commission on Audit (COA), promising "to give priority to gender and development" upon her appointment. The COA commissioners at the time were Chairperson Ma. Gracia M. Pulido Tan and Commissioner Heidi L. Mendoza, and Guanzon's filling of the third seat made the COA an all-women-led agency.

Commission on Elections

On April 28, 2015, Guanzon was named a commissioner to the Commission on Elections (COMELEC) for a seven-year term, lasting until February 2022.

During the 2022 Philippine presidential election, Guanzon notably presided over the disqualification cases filed against presidential candidate Bongbong Marcos that were raffled to the COMELEC First division. Days before retirement, Guanzon publicly named fellow commissioner Aimee Ferolino as "the one delaying the decision in favor of Marcos" before leaving the post. Guanzon claimed that Ferolino was purposely delaying her resolution regarding the disqualification case for Guanzon's vote to not be counted because of pending retirement. Guanzon publicly expressed dismay against Ferolino, and mentioned that an "influential senator" was also interfering with the case. Meanwhile, Ferolino lambasted Guanzon for "mind conditioning" the public against her and reiterated that "she needed more time". Eventually, the First Division decided to junk the petition in favor of Marcos after Guanzon's retirement.

P3PWD Party List
Rowena Guanzon campaigned for the P3PWD Party List during the 2022 House of Representatives elections although she was not among the official nominees of the organization. The partylist won a single seat.

On June 14, 2022, all of P3PWD's nominees withdrew and a new set of nominees was named with Guanzon as its first nominee. The Commission on Elections approved the substitution and Guanzon took oath on June 23. Guanzon's assumption of her position as P3PWD representative was halted by a temporary restraining order by the Supreme Court taking action on the petition of Ronald and Ducielle Marie Cardema of the Duterte Youth.

Publications

Guanzon's published works include Issues and Problems in the Enforcement of the Anti-Violence Against Women and Their Children Act of 2004, Philippine Law Journal (Dec 2008); Constitutional Challenges to the Anti-Violence Against Women and Their Children Act of 2004, Journal of the Integrated Bar of the Philippines (March 2009); The Anti-Trafficking in Persons Act: Issues and Problems, Journal of the Integrated Bar of the Philippines; and Legal and Conceptual Framework of Battered Woman Syndrome as a Defense, Philippine Law Journal (Vol. 86, No. 1 December 2011).

The U.P. Law Center also published Guanzon's book, The Anti-Sexual Harassment Act Notes and Cases in 2014. Guanzon is currently writing textbooks on The Local Government Code for the University of the Philippines and The Auditing Code of the Philippines Casebook.

References

Filipino civil servants
Benigno Aquino III administration personnel
Duterte administration personnel
Mayors of places in Negros Occidental
University of the Philippines Diliman alumni
Harvard Kennedy School alumni
Commissioners of constitutional commissions of the Philippines
Visayan people
Filipino women lawyers
Silliman University alumni
People from Negros Occidental
Hiligaynon people
20th-century Filipino women politicians
20th-century Filipino politicians
Politicians from Negros Occidental
Women mayors of places in the Philippines
20th-century Filipino lawyers
Mason Fellows